Wellington Central Library is a public library building in the central business district of Wellington, in New Zealand. It is owned by Wellington City Council and is listed as a Category 1 historic place by Heritage New Zealand. The building was opened in 1991 and was a key element of Wellington’s municipal centre, Te Ngākau Civic Square. It served as the main hub for the municipal library service, Wellington City Libraries.

The building was closed to the public at short notice on 19 March 2019, after Wellington City Council was advised by engineers that the building had structural vulnerabilities which meant it might not perform well in the event of a significant earthquake.

Former library buildings

1893–1940 
Wellington's first Council-operated public library opened in April 1893 on the corner of Mercer and Wakefield Streets in a building designed by William Crichton, a prominent architect of the time. An earthquake in February 1893, after the building was completed but before it opened, caused cracking that was repaired. The top of the building's tower was removed after being damaged in  another earthquake in 1897. By the mid-1930s the building was deemed too small, and there were concerns about safety in an earthquake such as the recent Napier earthquake, so planning for a new library began. The library closed in 1940 and the building was demolished in 1943.

1940–1991 

In 1940 a new reinforced concrete art deco-style library opened on a block between Mercer and Harris street, with its entrance on Mercer Street. (Mercer Street later disappeared when it was redeveloped as part of Civic Square in the late 1980s.) The building's design was the result of an architectural competition. Two designs, by Messenger, Taylor & Wolf from New Plymouth and Gummer & Ford from Auckland, were judged equally good so the two companies worked together on the final design. The building was a T shape, and was designed so that it could be enlarged into a H and possibly have an extra storey added, though this never eventuated. Five hundred Rongotai College students carried the library's books from the old building to the new one. 

By the early 1960s the library had become too small: some books were stored offsite because of lack of space, the newspaper reading room and some staff sections were housed elsewhere, and there was a lack of space for casual seating and study.

The new Wellington Central Library 

In 1989, Athfield Architects were commissioned to design a new Wellington Central Library. The brief given to the architects was for "a distinctive and attractive building that proclaims its function. The interior to be spacious, flexible, accessible and stimulating". Ian Athfield visited libraries in the United States and became interested in the vision of a library as an "information supermarket", providing as much information as possible to as many people as possible.

The Athfield Architects design won the Environmental Award in the 1992 Carter Holt Harvey Awards and the New Zealand Institute of Architects National Award (1993). The library was built by Fletcher Building and Construction.

The new Wellington Central Library was opened in 1991, and the previous library building then became the City Gallery. Both buildings are located in Civic Square, with the new library having its main entrance on Victoria Street and another entrance from Civic Square to the mezzanine level of the building. 

The new building offered  of extra public space and meant all services could be together in one building. There was also a public parking area in the basement with lift access to all floors, which improved access for those with mobility issues or young children. Aspects of the design were provocative and attracted controversy.

The new library cost $32 million and had  of space. The curved wall of the three storeys of the library facing Civic Square was made of glass with window seats and desks looking into the square. There was also a mezzanine floor between the ground and first floors, containing a café, public toilets, meeting rooms and a small retail space. The library was said to be the first public library in Australasia to have a café inside it, though the café had separate entrances for security reasons. The library featured various artworks including Para Matchitt's sculpture Waharoa, based on the gateway to Te Kooti's pā, which highlighted the library's Māori collection. A colonnade ran along the outside of the building from Victoria Street up a ramp to Civic Square, with its columns designed as metal nikau palms. Two more palms framed the main entrance in Victoria Street. At the third floor level a two-storey cantilevered portico connected the library to the neighbouring Council administration building. This structure contained offices, meeting rooms and a staff cafeteria.

The new building was opened by the Governor-General on 9 December 1991. A year later the library's manager Jane Hill reported that in its first year of operation the library had seen 70% more visitors, and a corresponding increase in items borrowed. The library had become a tourist attraction, and was popular with businesspeople at lunchtimes. She attributed the rise in numbers partly to the attractive design of the building. Clarks Café on the mezzanine floor also reported that the café had been very successful in its first year.

2013 earthquake damage 
The two-storey structure linking the library to the Council administration building was damaged in the July 2013 Seddon earthquake, and there were fears it might collapse. It was removed between November 2014 and February 2015 at a cost of  $800,000.

Seismic assessment and temporary closure 
In 2016 the Kaikōura earthquake damaged many buildings in Wellington, and some had to be demolished. The library building was not damaged, but Wellington City Council decided to close the building at short notice on 19 March 2019 after receiving reports from engineers that the building had structural issues which meant it might not perform well in the event of a large earthquake. Engineers said that "the building [has] a complex design with a flexible frame, large voids and irregular shape – all of these elements contribute to the building's structural vulnerability in a significant earthquake". The engineers had specific concerns about the fixings on the precast concrete floors which were of similar design to those in Statistics House, a building which had partially collapsed in the Kaikōura earthquake.

The failure of Statistics House and other Wellington buildings damaged in the Kaikōura earthquake had led to revision of seismic assessment guidelines. The Ministry of Business, Industry and Employment (MBIE) released The Seismic Assessment of Existing Buildings, commonly known as the Red Book, in July 2017. These guidelines provide "a technical basis for engineers to carry out seismic assessments of existing buildings". Section C5 deals with assessment of multi-storey concrete buildings. In 2018, section C5 was revised because understanding of building performance in the Kaikōura earthquake had changed. The revised section is known as the Yellow Book or Yellow Chapter. Assessment using the Yellow Book can lead to different results from assessment using the Red Book, but only the Red Book has legal standing. Wellington City Council's chief executive at the time, Kevin Lavery, requested an engineering assessment of the Central Library against the Yellow Book guidelines as soon as engineers understood how the new guidelines should be applied. It was determined that the building had an acceptable New Building Standard rating of 60 per cent according to Red Book guidelines, but only a 15 per cent rating under Yellow Book revised guidelines. Then-Mayor Justin Lester stated that "technically [the building's] earthquake rating under current code is 63 per cent but when you apply the lessons that we've learned from the Statistics Building it is almost 15 to 20 per cent which means it needs significant work".

At the time of its closure in March 2019, the Central Library was the second-most visited public building in Wellington, after Te Papa museum.

Pop-up replacement libraries
Following the closure of Wellington Central Library, three pop-up replacement libraries were opened in central Wellington: Arapaki Manners Library (opened in May 2019 in Manners Street), He Matapihi Molesworth Library (opened in October 2019 inside the National Library in Molesworth Street), and Te Awe Library in Brandon Street (opened in July 2020). However none of these has the reading rooms or the opening hours of the Central Library. Wellington Central Library's collection of 400,000 items was relocated to a new collection and distribution centre named Te Pātaka, in Johnsonville. Wellington City Council has stated that it prefers to have a large central library with floor loading designed to support the weight of many books and future-proofed for population growth, and that a large central library is a drawcard to bring people into the city centre, as well as providing a safe space for vulnerable people.

Controversy: repair or replace? 

In July 2019 the New Zealand Institute of Architects mounted a campaign to save the library, in response to the Mayor's suggestion that it be demolished. In June 2020 Wellington City Councillors voted 14–1 to repair rather than demolish the building, and announced three possible strengthening options costing between $90 million and $200 million. Criticism of any decision to repair the building came from the Taxpayers' Union, which stated that since the Council was in a poor financial position and in the middle of a pandemic, any spending on the building should be delayed. They believed the three city pop-up libraries provided adequate service for residents. 

Public consultation took place in September 2020, when the Council put forward five options for public consideration, including constructing a new building. Also in September 2020, acknowledging fears that the building might be demolished, Heritage New Zealand proposed that it should be listed as a Category 1 historic place. This would not stop demolition, but would help inform Wellington City Council's decision-making. Public opinion was divided, with some residents saying the services provided were more important than the design of the building, the cost of refurbishment was too high or that the refurbishment would take longer than starting again with a new building. 

After public consultation closed in October 2020, the Council announced that it would spend $179 million to repair and upgrade the library rather than demolish it. However in May 2021 the Council announced that it was still considering other options. In September 2021 Wellington City Council announced that it was disposing of the fittings in the Central Library, either putting fixtures into storage for four years or selling or recycling furniture that could not be used elsewhere by the Council. Artist impressions of the proposed redesign of the building, budgeted at $188 million, were released in April 2022.

Heritage status 
The Central Library's Category 1 historic place listing from Heritage New Zealand took effect from 10 March 2021. Heritage New Zealand states that Wellington Central Library has significance as an excellent example of late twentieth century library design and postmodern architecture in New Zealand. The building mixes a variety of materials and styles to create a welcoming space, with the large glass wall permitting people outside to see the library in action. Heritage New Zealand notes that the metal nikau palms forming a colonnade are a playful postmodern aspect of the building and have become one of its best-known and loved features. The palms are made from lead, copper and steel and finely detailed. There are nine palms supporting the building along the colonnade and another six at the top of the ramp leading from the colonnade across towards Civic Square. Two more palms flank the front entrance. The palms are up to 10 metres tall and cost $14,000 each.

Redesign and re-opening 
The Council decided on design principles for the new library in April 2021. These include designing a building that includes the whole population and supports social infrastructure: it should be a creative hub that will serve existing library users and welcome new users. The building will be future-proofed to respond to changes in population and how we access information, and facilitate access to information by integrating Wellington City Council services, Wellington City Archives and Capital E (a children's play and learning experience) into the same space. The building should be a visitor attraction with a strong Wellington identity. The library will engage fully with Māori, which includes renaming the library as Te Matapihi ki te Ao Nui. This name can be translated as ‘The window to the wider world’. The building will feature sustainability initiatives that will earn it a 5 Green Star rating from the New Zealand Green Building Council.

Athfield Architects have redesigned their 1991 building. The proposed new design for the building will have three additional entrances, including one on Harris Street. In Civic Square, the steps leading to the former mezzanine floor and café will be replaced by an entrance and café at ground level. Concrete walls will be replaced with glass, creating a brighter, more airy feeling.  Extensions will be added to the top two floors and base isolators will be installed under the building. Contractors for the construction project are LT McGuinness. To make space for the Council Service Centre, Wellington City Archives heritage area and Capital E play and makerspace zone in the building, half of the library's collection will be kept in storage rather than on shelves in the library. This decision has met with opposition from authors and researchers. In December 2022 Wellington City Council announced that the cost of the new building had risen to $200 million, which includes $6.5 million for 'cultural identity'.

As of January 2023, the Central Library building is expected to re-open in 2026.

References

External links

 Wellington Central Libraries website
History of Wellington City Libraries

Buildings and structures in Wellington City
Libraries in Wellington
Heritage New Zealand Category 1 historic places in the Wellington Region